Audubon Township may refer to the following townships in the United States:

 Audubon Township, Montgomery County, Illinois
 Audubon Township, Audubon County, Iowa
 Audubon Township, Becker County, Minnesota